Opatov is a municipality and village in Jihlava District in the Vysočina Region of the Czech Republic. It has about 200 inhabitants.

History
The first written mention of Opatov is from 1303.

References

Villages in Jihlava District